Saffell may refer to:

People
 Oliver Saffell (born 1986), English cricket player
 Samuel Saffell (1712–1777), English-born American colonist; see Colonial families of Maryland
 Tom Saffell (1921–2012), American baseball player

Places
 Saffell, Arkansas, United States